The 2018 NCAA Division I softball season, play of college softball in the United States organized by the National Collegiate Athletic Association (NCAA) at the Division I level, began in February 2018.  The season progressed through the regular season, many conference tournaments and championship series, and concluded with the 2018 NCAA Division I softball tournament and 2018 Women's College World Series.  The Women's College World Series, consisting of the eight remaining teams in the NCAA Tournament and held annually in Oklahoma City at ASA Hall of Fame Stadium, ended on June 4, 2018.

Conference standings

National Invitational Softball Championship

Loyola Marymount Lions defeated the UC Riverside Highlanders in the championship; Hannah Bandimere was named MVP for the series.

Women's College World Series
The 2018 Women's College World Series began on June 1–4 in Oklahoma City.

Season leaders
Batting
Batting average: .483 – Holly Speers, Kent State Golden Flashes
RBIs: 76 – Brook Miko, Towson Tigers
Home runs: 30 – Jocelyn Alo, Oklahoma Sooners

Pitching
Wins: 33-6 – Meghan Beaubien, Michigan Wolverines
ERA: 0.48 (7 ER/102.1 IP) – Brittany Gray, Georgia Bulldogs
Strikeouts: 353 – Lindsey Bert, Furman Paladins

Records
NCAA Division I single game combined strikeouts:
46 – Brianna Jones, Southern Illinois Salukis (20) & Morgan Florey, Evansville Purple Aces (26); April 28, 2018 (16 innings)

Senior class single game walks:
6 – Ivie Drake, Georgia State Panthers; April 18, 2018

Senior class 7 inning single game strikeouts:
21 – Alexis Osorio, Alabama Crimson Tide; March 10, 2018

Freshman class doubles:
29 – Sydney Sherrill, Florida State Seminoles

Freshman class saves:
15 – Taylor Bauman, Florida Gulf Coast Eagles

Team walks:
360 – Florida Gators

Awards
USA Softball Collegiate Player of the Year:
Rachel Garcia, UCLA Bruins

Honda Sports Award Softball:
Rachel Garcia, UCLA Bruins

NFCA National Player of the Year:
Rachel Garcia, UCLA Bruins

espnW National Player of The Year:
Rachel Garcia, UCLA Bruins

NFCA National Freshman of the Year:
Jocelyn Alo, Oklahoma Sooners

NFCA Catcher of the Year: 
Gwen Svekis, Oregon

NFCA Golden Shoe Award: 
Cortni Emanuel, Georgia

All America Teams
The following players were members of the All-American Teams.

First Team

Second Team

Third Team

References

External links